Mandoul Occidental (Mandoul West) is one of the 3 departments which make up the region of Mandoul in Chad. The capital is Bédjondo.

Mandoul Occidental has three sub-prefectures:
 Bédjondo
 Bébopen 
 Békamba

References

Departments of Chad
Mandoul Region